Lauren Davis was the defending champion having won the previous edition in 2019, but chose not to participate.

Katie Volynets won the title after defeating Irina Bara 6–7(4–7), 7–6(7–2), 6–1 in the final.

Seeds

Draw

Finals

Top half

Bottom half

References

Main Draw

FineMark Women's Pro Tennis Championship - Singles